This is a list of awards and nominations received by American actress, author, and producer Sela Ward.

Major associations

Golden Globe Awards

Primetime Emmy Awards

Screen Actors Guild Awards

Other awards and nominations

CableACE Awards

CinemaCon Awards

Gold Derby Awards

Golden Raspberry Awards

Online Film & Television Association Awards

Satellite Awards

TCA Awards

TV Guide Awards

Viewers for Quality Television Awards

References

External links
 

Ward, Sela